El Vallecillo is a municipality located in the province of Teruel, Aragon, Spain. According to the 2004 census (INE), the municipality has a population of 60 inhabitants.

Notable inhabitants
José Atarés (1960–2013), mayor of Zaragoza, senator for the province of Zaragoza

References 

Municipalities in the Province of Teruel